The Kenya Cup is the top tier club rugby union competition in Kenya organized by the Kenya Rugby Union. For the 2019-2020 season, twelve teams are divided into two pools of six, Each team plays home and away against each team in its pool and once against each team in the other pool. The top six teams in the single-table format qualify for the playoff finals: the top two teams secure a home semi-final. The other four teams are paired into two knock-out games: the winners of the two games each play one of the two top-ranked teams (that had secured an automatic semi-final berth). The winners of the two semi-final fixtures play in the final to determine the overall winner(the top-ranked team before the playoffs hosts the final). 

Promotion and relegation exists between the Kenya Cup, Championship and Nationwide leagues. The two lowest placed teams in the Kenya Cup are relegated to the Championship, and the top two teams in the Championship are promoted to the Kenya Cup. Games are played on Saturday afternoons usually preceded by corresponding fixtures in the Eric Shirley Shield.

The Kenya Cup was founded in 1970 by the newly formed Kenya Rugby Football Union with the first tournament won by Impala RFC.

KCB RFC retained the Kenya Cup for a third successive time after a 23-15 victory over Kabras Sugar in the final contested on 18 May 2019 at the Kakamega Showgrounds.

2021 Kenya Cup teams

2021 Kenya Cup Final Standings

These are the final standings of the Kenya Cup.

Champions

The previous champions of the Kenya Cup are:

 1970: Impala RFC
 1971: Impala RFC
 1972: Impala RFC
 1973: Impala RFC
 1974: Impala RFC
 1975: Nondescripts RFC
 1976: Nondescripts RFC
 1977: Mean Machine RFC
 1978: Nondescripts RFC
 1979: Nondescripts RFC
 1980: Nondescripts RFC
 1981: Nondescripts RFC
 1982: Nondescripts RFC
 1983: Mwamba RFC
 1984: Nondescripts RFC
 1985: Nondescripts RFC
 1986: Nondescripts RFC
 1987: Barclays Bank RFC
 1988: Nondescripts RFC
 1989: Mean Machine RFC
 1990: Mean Machine RFC
 1991: Nondescripts RFC
 1992: Nondescripts RFC
 1993: Nondescripts RFC
 1994: Nondescripts RFC
 1995: Kenya Harlequin F.C.

 1996: Kenya Harlequin F.C.
 1997: Nondescripts RFC
 1998: Nondescripts RFC
 1999: Kenya Harlequin F.C.
 2000: Impala RFC
 2001: Impala RFC
 2002: Impala RFC
 2003: Kenya Harlequin F.C.
 2004: Impala RFC
 2005: KCB RFC
 2006: KCB RFC
 2007: KCB RFC
 2008: Kenya Harlequin F.C.
 2009: Impala RFC
 2010: Kenya Harlequin F.C.
 2011: Kenya Harlequin F.C. 
 2012: Kenya Harlequin F.C.
 2013: Nakuru RFC
 2014: Nakuru RFC
 2015: KCB RFC
 2016: Kabras Sugar
 2017: KCB RFC
 2018: KCB RFC
 2019: KCB RFC
 2021: KCB RFC
2022:Kabras Sugar RC

a.  This webpage states that Harlequins had also had "Previous Kenya Cup victories: 1955, 1957, 1964, 1988".  This is probably incorrect as these are years that Harlequins won the Enterprise Cup.The Kenya Cup was inaugurated in 1970. Before 1970 the competition which was held was called the Nairobi District Championship. However the 1995 victory seems likely as it is included in a list that also shows the Enterprise Cup win that year.

Titles by team

References

External links
 Kenya Cup Official Website

Rugby union competitions in Kenya
1970 establishments in Kenya